Multiplacophora is a stem-group of chitons with a number of plates arranged in 7 rows along the body. They date to at least the Upper Cambrian, but two lower Cambrian fossils- Ocruranus and Trachyplax - may extend the range downwards.

Families and genera 
 Family Hercolepadidae Dzik, 1986
 Genus Hercolepas Aurivillius, 1892
 Genus Protobalanus Hall and Clarke, 1888
 Family Strobilepidae Hoare and Mapes, 1995
 Genus Aenigmatectus Hoare and Mapes, 1996
 Genus Deltaplax Puchalski, Johnson, Kauffman and Eernisse, 2009
 Genus Diadeloplax Hoare and Mapes, 1995
 Genus Hannestheronia Vinther, Jell, Kampouris, Carney, Racicot & Briggs, 2012
 Genus Polysacos Vendrasco, Wood and Runnegar, 2004
 Genus Strobilepis Clarke in Hall and Clarke, 1888

References 

Devonian animals
Late Devonian animals
Chitons